Sora Inoue may refer to:
 The artist of the manga Samurai Girl: Real Bout High School and Mai Ball!
 Sora Inoue, a fictional character of Bleach